Student riots, college riots, or campus riots are riots precipitated by students, generally from a college, university, or other school. Student riots are often an aspect of student protests.

Reasons 
As with riots in general, the causes are varied.

Student riots have often been political in nature, such as those that were common in the US and Western Europe during the Vietnam War era. Student riots in China during 1989 arose when the students started protesting against the injustice of their politicians. In a number of countries, such as Mexico, Chile, Iran, Venezuela and Bangladesh, students form an active political force, and student riots can occur in the context of wider political or social grievances. On some occasions student riots have accompanied a general strike, a student strike, or wider national protests.

Student riots have also been seen as hooliganism—such as after sporting events—with some in the US being linked to alcohol consumption.

Responses 
Responses to riots are also varied. In response to student riots in China during 1989, the Chinese government opposed the protests and brutally beat and murdered those who participated in them.

Examples 
The following are some examples of famous student riots:
 University of Paris strike of 1229
St Scholastica Day riot at the University of Oxford
 Rowbottom (riot), a series of student riots at the University of Pennsylvania between the 1920s and 1970s
White-supremacist riots at the University of Alabama after Autherine Lucy's admission in 1956
Ole Miss riot of 1962 at the University of Mississippi
 Many of the protests of 1968 included student riots, such as:
 French May
 German student movement
Columbia University protests of 1968
Battle of Valle Giulia in Italy 
 Tlatelolco massacre of students at Mexico
 Opposition to the Vietnam War
 Tiananmen Square protests of 1989
Iran student protests, July 1999
 2010 United Kingdom student protests
 2012 Quebec student protests

See also 
 Urban riots
 Student activism
 Student protest

References 

Student riots